Lummus Park is a  public, urban park in Miami Beach (Miami-Dade, Florida), on the Atlantic Ocean.

Description
The park is on the eastern side of Ocean Drive, from 5th to 15th Streets. When redesigned and improved in the mid-1980s, it became part of the project for the redevelopment of what is now the Miami Beach Architectural District of South Beach. Along Ocean Drive, the park shows grassy areas and palm trees, alongside volleyball courts and pull up bars. A wavy pedestrian walk, called the Promenade, separates the grass of the park and the beach up to 21st St, where it turns into boardwalk. The sidewalk is inspired by Brazilian landscape architect Roberto Burle Marx's oceanfront walk along Copacabana Beach near Rio de Janeiro.

The park is a great backdrop for photo shoots, which happen frequently, and it initially became the location for many scenes from the television series "Miami Vice". The Miami Beach park and the Deco streetscape along Ocean Drive continue to be featured in "Miami" location shots for television and movies, and can be seen in episodes of the USA Network's Burn Notice.

Events
Lummus Park hosts the Nautica South Beach Triathlon every year, an event featuring a 1.5K ocean swim, a 40K bike course, and a 10K run course.

See also
 Lummus Park, Miami

References

Gallery

External links

Parks in Miami-Dade County, Florida